John Mason (born 2 September 1987) is a Canadian long-distance runner. In 2019, he competed in the men's marathon at the 2019 World Athletics Championships held in Doha, Qatar. He finished in 36th place.

References

External links 
 
 

Living people
1987 births
Place of birth missing (living people)
Canadian male long-distance runners
Canadian male marathon runners
Canadian male cross country runners
World Athletics Championships athletes for Canada
20th-century Canadian people
21st-century Canadian people